Three Keys is a 1925 American silent drama film directed by Edward LeSaint and starring Edith Roberts, Jack Mulhall and Gaston Glass.

Cast
 Edith Roberts as Clarita Ortega
 Jack Mulhall as Jack Millington
 Gaston Glass as George Lathrop
 Virginia Lee Corbin as Edna Trevor
 Miss DuPont as Alice Trevor
 Charles Clary as John Trevor
 Stuart Holmes as Fenwick Chapman
 Joseph W. Girard as Sam Millington

References

Bibliography
 Munden, Kenneth White. The American Film Institute Catalog of Motion Pictures Produced in the United States, Part 1. University of California Press, 1997.

External links

1925 films
1925 drama films
American black-and-white films
Silent American drama films
American silent feature films
1920s English-language films
Films directed by Edward LeSaint
1920s American films
English-language drama films